Shahid Nazeri is a high-aspect-ratio twin-hull vessel operated by the Navy of the Islamic Revolutionary Guard Corps of Iran.

Name
The vessel is named after Mohammad Nazeri, the first commander of the IRGCN marines. It has been referred to as support ship HARTH 55 by the American military intelligence agencies.

Description
The vessel is 55 meters long with a claimed long-range support capability of 5,400 nautical miles (10,000 kilometers). With a super-slender aluminum hull, she is capable of carrying some 100 troops and has also a helipad for one aircraft. Shahid Nazeri'''s speed is reportedly 28 knots.

Operational historyShahid Nazeri was commissioned in September 2016 at Bushehr.

In April 2017, satellite imagery suggested that Shahid Nazeri was relocated to an operational naval base at the headquarters of 1st Naval Region in Bandar Abbas. The vessel did not participate in the Exercise Velayat 95 and only made "brief stints into nearby waters". Shahid Nazeri was among Iranian vessels that participated in Marine Security Belt joint wargame with the Chinese and Russian navies, whose units were led respectively by destroyer Xining (117) and frigate Yaroslav Mudry (777).

Analyses
Kelsey D. Atherton of the Popular Science opined that the vessel is "mostly for show" and "[i]t’s unclear how the Nazeri fits into this larger speedboat-heavy strategy". Chris Biggers commented at Bellingcat that "[a] high-speed catamaran-like vessel could be useful" for Iran for establishing itself as a regional power, as well as moving operations beyond the Strait of Hormuz. Farzin Nadimi, an associate fellow with The Washington Institute, wrote in 2020 that Shahid Nazeri'' could be the flagship of the IRGC's naval forces because it has not been deployed for long-range missions and spends most of its time moored at the command headquarters.

References

External links
 Profile at GlobalSecurity.org

2016 ships
Ships of the Islamic Revolutionary Guard Corps
Small waterplane area twin hull vessels
Military catamarans
Ships built in Bushehr